Listerby is a locality situated in Ronneby Municipality, Blekinge County, Sweden with 883 inhabitants in 2010.

References 

Populated places in Ronneby Municipality